Joven, viuda y estanciera (English: Young Widow and the Station Wagon) is a 1970 Argentine film based on Claudio Martínez Payva's play of the same name. Produced in Eastmancolor, the film was directed by Julio Saraceni and written by Ariel Cortazzo. It stars Lolita Torres, Jorge Barreiro, Luis Landriscina, and Ignacio Quirós. The film was released in Argentina on September 24, 1970.

References

External links
 

1970 films
Argentine musical comedy films
1970s Spanish-language films
Films directed by Julio Saraceni
1970s Argentine films